Radovan Vujović (born 8 September 1984) is a Serbian actor, comedian and director.

After graduating Faculty of Dramatic Arts in Belgrade in 2005, he became a member of the Boško Buha Theatre. Since 2010, he works as a member of the Yugoslav Drama Theatre ensemble.

In 2006, he made his first lead role in Šejtanov ratnik. He has since starred in numerous films, including We Will Be the World Champions (2015), ZG80 (2016), Offenders (2017) and King Petar of Serbia (2018). He is perhaps best known for his critically lauded role as Radisav Risović Ris in the successful television series Vojna akademija (2012-2017), and films Vojna akademija (2012) and Vojna akademija 2 (2013).

Biography
A native of the western Serbian city Užice, he graduated from the Faculty of Dramatic Arts, University of Arts in Belgrade in the class of Biljana Mašić. He was hired as a member in the Boško Buha Theatre upon graduation. He performed in the theatre from 2005 to 2010, and has accomplished lead roles in plays such as Othello, As You Like It, The Brothers Karamazov, Three Sisters, In Agony, Tartuffe, Metamorphosis and Les Précieuses ridicules, presenting himself well in comedic and dramatic roles. He has also performed as a guest in several European theatres.

He has won two Emperor Constantine (Car Konstantin) awards, one for Pogled u nebo and one for Offenders. He won the Dr. Branivoj Đorđević Award in 2010. He has won three prominent JDP Theatre Awards, in 2009, 2011 and 2016. 

His first prominent television role came with the comedic, rural portrayal of aggressive loner Siledžija Mića in the popular Serbian television series Ljubav, navika, panika, with Zijah Sokolović and Gorica Popović in supporting roles.

He is widely known for his role as Radisav Risović Ris in the successful television series Vojna akademija (2012-2017), and the films Vojna akademija (2012) and Vojna akademija 2 (2013). He portrayed Prince Paul of Yugoslavia in the Dragan Bjelogrlić-directed cult televised series Shadows over Balkan.

Alongside fellow actor and close friend Jakov Jevtović, Vujović directed, conceived and starred in the commercially successful comedy mini-series Komunalci, as gaffe-prone and corrupt police officer Gaga.

He was nominated for an Apollo Award for his role as Srđan Kalember in the cult 2015 sports drama film We Will Be the World Champions, directed by Darko Bajić.

He has voiced numerous characters for Serbian-language versions of prominent animated feature films.

Filmography

Film

Television

Voice-over roles

References

External links
 

1984 births
Living people
People from Užice
Serbian comedians
20th-century Serbian male actors
21st-century Serbian male actors
Serbian male actors
Serbian male stage actors
Serbian male television actors
Serbian male film actors
Serbian male voice actors
Dr. Branivoj Đorđević Award winners